Thanakorn Srichaphan (born 20 May 1968) is a Thai tennis coach and former professional player. He has featured as both a player and captain on the Thailand Davis Cup team.

Tennis career
The eldest of the Srichaphan brothers, he had a long Davis Cup career for Thailand, debuting in 1985. He was later joined in the team by brother Narathorn and missed out on playing with youngest brother Paradorn by a year, making his last appearance in 1997. His 27 Davis Cup ties for Thailand included wins in 22 singles rubbers.

Srichaphan was a regular competitor for Thailand at the Asian Games and Southeast Asian Games. A team bronze medalist at the 1986 Asian Games, he won multiple Southeast Asian Games gold medals in the doubles and team events. His best singles result was a silver medal at the 1995 Southeast Asian Games.

On the ATP Tour, Srichaphan made a main draw appearance as a wildcard at the 1996 Singapore Open.

References

External links
 
 
 

1968 births
Living people
Thanakorn Srichaphan
Thanakorn Srichaphan
Asian Games medalists in tennis
Tennis players at the 1986 Asian Games
Medalists at the 1986 Asian Games
Tennis players at the 1994 Asian Games
Competitors at the 1985 Southeast Asian Games
Competitors at the 1987 Southeast Asian Games
Competitors at the 1989 Southeast Asian Games
Competitors at the 1991 Southeast Asian Games
Competitors at the 1995 Southeast Asian Games
Southeast Asian Games medalists in tennis
Thanakorn Srichaphan
Thanakorn Srichaphan
Thanakorn Srichaphan